Ministry of Law and Judiciary Department Maharashtra is a Ministry of Government of Maharashtra. The Ministry is currently headed by  Deputy Chief Minister of Maharashtra Devendra Fadnavis.

Head office

List of Cabinet Ministers

List of Ministers of State

References

Government ministries of Maharashtra